Farron is a surname. Notable people with this surname include:

  (born 1935), botanist
 Ivan Farron (born 1971), Swiss writer
 Julia Farron (1922–2019), English ballerina
 Tim Farron (born 1970), British politician